The Indonesia men's national junior ice hockey team is the men's national under-20 ice hockey team of Indonesia. The team is controlled by the Indonesia Ice Hockey Federation, a member of the International Ice Hockey Federation. The team made its international debut in December 2018 at the 2019 IIHF U20 Challenge Cup of Asia Division I tournament which it went on to finish third.

History
The Indonesia men's national junior ice hockey team debuted at the 2019 IIHF U20 Challenge Cup of Asia Division I tournament in Kuala Lumpur, Malaysia. Their opening game of the tournament was against Kuwait which they won 10–3, and is also currently their largest and only win in international competition. Indonesia went on to lose their other two games against Mongolia and Thailand, finishing the tournament in third. Their 0–15 loss to Thailand is currently their biggest loss in international competition. Goaltender Sangga Putra was selected as the best Indonesian player of the tournament.

International competitions
2019 IIHF U20 Challenge Cup of Asia. Finish: 7th place (3rd in Division I)
2022 IIHF U20 Asia and Oceania Championship. Finish: 7th

Players and personnel

Roster
From the team's most recent tournament

Team staff
From the team's most recent tournament
Head coach: Ronald Wijaya
Assistant coach: Andianto Hie
General manager: Simon Hartanto
Team leader: Raymond Synarso
Equipment manager: Felix Yussanto
Team staff: Mozes Iwan Mulyawan

References

External links
Indonesia Ice Hockey Federation

National
Junior national ice hockey teams
National ice hockey teams in Asia
Ice hockey